John Bailey (born 1954) is an Australian former rugby league footballer who played in the 1970s.

Playing career
Bailey came to St George Dragons from Inverell, New South Wales, in 1973 and made first grade in 1975. 

He was a member of the St. George team that won the Under 23s grand final in 1974 and made it into first grade the following year. He played in the devastating 1975 Grand Final loss to Eastern Suburbs but returned in 1977 to play in the 1977 Grand Final victory over Parramatta Eels, scoring a penalty try in the last minutes of the match.

Coaching career
He retired after the grand final and went on to coach Western Suburbs between 1988 and 1990 after having coached the lower grades at the St. George Dragons.  Bailey's time as Western Suburbs coach was not a successful one and the club finished last in 1988.  Bailey's final 2 seasons at the club saw Wests finish 14th and 13th on the table.

References

1954 births
Living people
Australian rugby league players
Date of birth missing (living people)
Rugby league five-eighths
Rugby league players from Inverell, New South Wales
St. George Dragons coaches
St. George Dragons players
Western Suburbs Magpies coaches